The Canton of Blois-3 is an administrative division of the Loir-et-Cher department, central France. Its borders were modified at the French canton reorganisation which came into effect in March 2015. Its seat is in Blois.

It consists of the following communes:
 
Blois (partly)
Candé-sur-Beuvron
Chailles
Chaumont-sur-Loire
Le Controis-en-Sologne (partly)
Monthou-sur-Bièvre
Les Montils
Rilly-sur-Loire
Sambin
Seur
Valaire

References

Cantons of Loir-et-Cher